Tales from the Heart is the title of a series of comic books and graphic novels, written by Cindy Goff and Rafael Nieves and illustrated by Seitu Hayden. Told through the eyes of protagonist Cathy Grant, the comics detail the adventures of a Peace Corps volunteer in the Central African Republic in the mid-1980s. The work explores why so much effort by so many volunteers wrought so little change. Later stories delve into the reign of the mad dictator Jean-Bédel Bokassa.

Publication history 
The first two issues of the ongoing series were published by Entropy Enterprises in 1987, with nine later issues published by Slave Labor Graphics (from 1988 to 1994). Slave Labor published Tales from the Heart: Hearts of Africa in 1994, which collected issues #1-3 and featured an  introduction by Neil Gaiman. 

Two color graphic novels, Tales from the Heart of Africa: The Temporary Natives (1990) and A Tale From the Heart of Africa: Bloodlines (1992) were published by the Marvel Comics imprint Epic Comics.

Awards 
A Tale From the Heart of Africa: Bloodlines (Epic, 1992) was nominated for two Eisner Awards in 1993, for Best Single Issue, Self-Contained Story; and Best Graphic Album — New.

Notes

References 

Slave Labor Graphics titles
Epic Comics titles
Non-fiction graphic novels
Peace Corps in fiction
Central African Republic culture